They Call Me Trinity is a 1970 Italian Spaghetti Western comedy film written and directed by Enzo Barboni (under the pseudonym of E.B. Clucher) and produced by Italo Zingarelli. The film stars Terence Hill and Bud Spencer as two brothers, Trinity and Bambino, who help defend a Mormon settlement from Mexican bandits and the henchman of the land-grabbing Major Harriman. It was filmed on location in Lazio, Italy, with financial backing from West Film.

The sequel, Trinity Is Still My Name, was even more successful than They Call Me Trinity. In 1995, Sons of Trinity, starring Heath Kizzier and Keith Neubert,  was released as a continuation of the Trinity series.

Plot
Trinity, a lazy, ne'er-do-well gunfighter with unnaturally fast drawing ability and marksmanship, is dragged on a travois by his horse to a way station and restaurant. There, he encounters a pair of bounty hunters with an injured Mexican prisoner. Trinity calmly takes the Mexican away from the two men, killing them before they can shoot him in the back. The pair reach a small town, where they witness the local sheriff, a large, burly man with a similarly fast drawing ability to Trinity, gunning down three men after they harass him for not allowing one of their criminal friends to be released.

It becomes apparent that Trinity and the man, Bambino, are brothers. Bambino is merely posing as the new sheriff of the small town while he awaits the arrival of his gang from the penitentiary from which he escaped, following a run-in with the actual sheriff who incidentally took the same way as Bambino on his way to his new post. Bambino is not happy to see his trouble-making brother. However, the two form a temporary partnership to deal with Major Harriman, who is attempting to run a group of pacifist Mormon farmers off their land with the intention of using their property to graze his own horses. The fact that these horses are valuable and unbranded explains Bambino's grudging willingness to work with his little brother, even though he considers Trinity to be a shiftless bum without ambition.

Trinity has fallen in love with two Mormon sisters and is genuinely concerned with the Mormon settlers' welfare. He persuades Bambino and Bambino's henchmen to help train the pacifistic Mormons to fight, and in the final battle, the Mormon leader finds in the Book of Ecclesiastes in the Bible that "there is a time for fighting" and the Mormons are unleashed against Major Harriman's goons, using the dirty fighting tricks that they have just learned.

Bambino is flabbergasted and infuriated to learn that Trinity has given the Major's horses to the Mormons. Trinity is about to be happily married to the two Mormon sisters when he learns that being a married Mormon means actually having to work, causing him to hurry after Bambino, who angrily sends him off in the opposite direction. After Bambino departs for California, the real sheriff appears, and Trinity points him in Bambino's direction. Trinity then reclines in his travois and brings up the rear with his horse, following them all.

Cast

 Terence Hill as Trinity, "The Right Hand of the Devil"
 Bud Spencer as Bambino, "The Left Hand of the Devil"
 Farley Granger as Major Harriman
 Steffen Zacharias as Jonathan
 Dan Sturkie as Tobias
 Gisela Hahn as Sarah
 Elena Pedemonte as Judith
 Ezio Marano as Weasel
 Luciano Rossi as Timid
 Michele Cimarosa as Drunken Mexican
 Ugo Sasso as crippled Sheriff 
 Remo Capitani as Mezcal
 Riccardo Pizzuti as Jeff
 Paolo Magalotti as Harriman Henchman
 Antonio Monselesan as Bounty Hunter
 Gaetano Imbrò as Blond Bounty Hunter
 Gigi Bonos as Ozgur, the Bartender

Production
Director Enzo Barboni wrote the original story and screenplay for the film. Initially, the script only included the Trinity character and not Bambino but producer Italo Zingarelli suggested the inclusion of a brother. When the film was first announced, Peter Martell was set to play Trinity and George Eastman as Bambino. The two characters were later portrayed by Terence Hill and Bud Spencer, who were then a popular comic duo following the release of Western film God Forgives... I Don't! in October 1967 in Italy, where they were cast as comedic and violent characters. Hill and Spencer did their own stunts in the film with the rest of the supporting cast being portrayed predominantly by stuntmen.

Interiors and the towns in the film were shot at Incir De Paolis Studios in Rome. The stage station was shot at Magliana quarry in Lazio, while the valley locations were shot at Parco Dei Monti Simbruini.  The waterfall scene was shot at Treja Valley Park.

The main title song was written by Franco Micalizzi and Lally Stott. It is sung by David King, who is billed as "Annibale" on Italian soundtrack releases. "Trinity: Titoli" was later used as the closing theme for Quentin Tarantino's 2012 Western Django Unchained.

Release
They Call Me Trinity was released just before Christmas in 1970 in Italy. The film was popular abroad, such as in Spain where it outgrossed all previous Italian Westerns except For A Few Dollars More. It proved foundational for all future German dubs of films starring Hill and Spencer: the main dialogue was rewritten to be more humorous, with parts of the film silent in the original receiving additional dialogue from characters standing with their back to the camera. The film was released in the United States and United Kingdom in 1971. As of 2004, They Call Me Trinity was the 22nd most successful Italian film, one position below The Good, The Bad, and The Ugly.

Following the popularity of the film, derivative films were released such as Two Sons of Trinity and the Carambola series which featured Hill and Spencer lookalikes Michael Coby and Paul L. Smith. Other films also started with the They Call Me... title, including They Call Me Hallelujah, They Call Me Cemetery, and They Call Me Holy Ghost.

Critical reception
Howard Thompson of The New York Times praised the film's sense of humour, as did Roger Ebert, who gave the film two-and-a-half out of four stars. In a review published by Time Out, the film is called "first and best in the Trinity series of spaghetti Westerns, rare in that it is successful in combining laughter and some degree of interest in the action". In his book Once Upon a Time in the Italian West: The Filmgoers' Guide to Spaghetti Westerns, author Howard Hughes writes "They Call Me Trinity is Hill and Spencer's finest vehicle".

References

Footnotes

Sources

External links
 
 

1970 films
Mormonism in fiction
Spaghetti Western films
1970s Western (genre) comedy films
Films set in the 19th century
Terence Hill and Bud Spencer
Films about identity theft
Films shot in Abruzzo
Films scored by Franco Micalizzi
1970 comedy films
1970s Italian films